Nomads Soccer Club (formerly San Diego Nomads) is an American soccer club based in San Diego, California. From 1986 to 1990, the club fielded a professional senior team, but has since operated as an amateur and youth club.

History
The Nomads were founded in 1976. They added a senior team, the Western Soccer Alliance, in 1986. The club became not-for-profit in 1987. In 1989, the WSA changed its name to the Western Soccer League and in 1990, the team joined the American Professional Soccer League. In 1990, the WSL merged with the American Soccer League. After winning the WSL championship in 1989, they lost to the Fort Lauderdale Strikers of the ASL in the 1989 National Pro Soccer Championship. After the 1990 season, the Nomads relinquished its senior team due to the financial demands of the American soccer league. The club continued as an amateur club, which still exists, in San Diego County.

Year-by-year

Coach
  Derek Armstrong: 1986–1990

  Brian McManus (assistant): 1986–1990

Notable players
  Paul Caligiuri (1986)
  Rob Ryerson (1986)
  Brian McManus (1986, 1989)
  Jeff Duback (1986)
  Anton Nistl (1987–1990)
  Marcelo Balboa (1987–1989)
  Paul Dougherty (1988)
  Cle Kooiman (1990)
  Steve Boardman 1986-1990
  Eric Wynalda 1988–1990
  Frankie Hejduk (1989-1991)
  Jovan Kirovski (1991)
  Joe Corona (2006-2008)
  Earl Edwards Jr. (2009-2010)
  Christopher Jaime (until 2019)
  Eric Avila
  Joe Gallardo
  Chuy Sanchez
  Gabriel Farfán
  Luca de la Torre (2011–2012)

References 

N
Western Soccer Alliance teams
Soccer clubs in California
American Professional Soccer League teams